General elections were held in Anguilla on 16 March 1994. Despite a large drop in the Anguilla United Party's vote share, the loss of the Road North constituency to the Anguilla Democratic Party gave the second and third parties enough seats to form a coalition government. Hubert Hughes of the Anguilla United Party, who had stood on a pro-independence platform, was appointed Chief Minister following the elections. The small Anguilla for Good Government party replaced the Party for Anguilla's Culturisation and Economy as the fourth party, but like its predecessor, failed to win representation. The future Chief Minister Osbourne Fleming held his seat of Sandy Hill as an independent.

Results
John Gumbs and David Carty were nominated to be the appointed members. However, the Speaker of the House refused to swear in Carty, leaving the post unfilled.

By constituency

References

Elections in Anguilla
1994 in Anguilla
Anguilla
Anguilla
March 1994 events in North America